Salzbergen is a municipality in the Emsland district, Lower Saxony, Germany. It is situated on the river Ems, approx. 25 km south of Lingen, and 10 km northwest of Rheine.

It has the oldest oil refinery in the world, opened in 1860.

Salzbergen station is on the Emsland Railway.

References

Emsland